Abu Bakr Rabee Ibn Ahmad Al-Akhawyni Bokhari (Al-Akhawyni Bokhari) (died 983 CE) was a Persian physician and surgeon the author of the Hidayat al-Muta`allemin Fi al-Tibb, the oldest document in the history of Iranian Traditional Medicine (ITM). He lived during the Golden Age of Iranian-Islamic medicine and his book was used as a reference text for medical students long after his death. Al-Akhawyni Bokhari wrote about anatomy, physiology, pathology, pharmacology, signs, symptoms, treatment of the disease and surgery of tumors, urine stones, eyes, knee, bones, ... his time. His reputation was based on the treatment of patients with mental illnesses.

References

10th-century Iranian physicians
983 deaths
Year of birth unknown